The 1991 Segunda División B play-offs were the final playoffs for the promotion from 1990–91 Segunda División B to 1991–92 Segunda División. The first four teams in each group took part in the play-off. The teams played a league of four teams, divided into 4 groups. The champion of each group promoted to Segunda División.

Group A

Results

Group B

Results

Group C

Results

Group D

Results

Segunda División B play-offs
1991 Spanish football leagues play-offs
play